Midori Yajima (born 17 April 1979) is a Japanese sport shooter. He competed at the 2012 Summer Olympics in the Men's 10 metre air rifle, finishing in 38th place, the men's 50 m rifle 3 positions, finishing in 39th place, and the men's 50 m rifle prone, finishing in 33rd place.

References

External links

Japanese male sport shooters
Living people
Olympic shooters of Japan
Shooters at the 2012 Summer Olympics
Asian Games medalists in shooting
Shooters at the 2010 Asian Games
Shooters at the 2014 Asian Games
Asian Games bronze medalists for Japan
Medalists at the 2014 Asian Games
Sportspeople from Ibaraki Prefecture
21st-century Japanese people
1979 births